Nectandra brochidodroma is a species of plant in the family Lauraceae. It is endemic to Peru.  It is threatened by habitat loss.

References

brochidodroma
Endemic flora of Peru
Vulnerable flora of South America
Taxonomy articles created by Polbot
Trees of Peru